Solana Shopping Park is a large shopping complex in the north west corner of Chaoyang Park in Beijing's Chaoyang District.

The center was opened in December of 2008 and hosts more than 500 retailers and restaurants.

Solana Shopping Park is part of the Blue Harbor Commercial Facilities project, run by Beijing Blue Harbor Real Estate Co., Ltd. The parcel that includes the shopping park was purchased in 2004 for RMB 1.008 billion.

References

External links
 Website (in Chinese)
 Website (in English

2008 establishments in China
Buildings and structures in Chaoyang District, Beijing
Shopping malls in Beijing
Shopping malls established in 2008